Frank E. Murphy (born May 17, 1896) was a Michigan politician.

Early life
Murphy was born on May 17, 1896 to Irish-American parents. He attended school in Hartford, Connecticut.

Military career
He served in the United States Army in France for eighteen months during World War I. He was in the 26th Infantry Division.

Political career
Murphy was elected as a Republican member of the Michigan House of Representatives from the Wayne County 1st district on November 4, 1924. Murphy served in this position from January 7, 1925 to 1926.

References

1896 births
United States Army personnel of World War I
Military personnel from Michigan
Republican Party members of the Michigan House of Representatives
20th-century American politicians
Year of death missing